Milorad Belić (12 November 1940 – 27 November 2020) was a Serbian lawyer and basketball player.

Playing career 
Belić played 5 seasons for Crvena zvezda of the Yugoslav First Basketball League, from 1958 to 1962. Over 78 games he scored 187 points. At the time his teammates were Vladimir Cvetković, Ratomir Vićentić, Sreten Dragojlović, and Vladislav Lučić among others.

In 1962, Belić moved to France where he played two seasons for JA Vichy of the Première Division under Đorđe Andrijašević, from 1962 to 1964.

Post-playing career 
In 1968, Belić begun his career as a lawyer. His expertise was arbitration.

In 2010, Belić was named a board member of Crvena zvezda, led by the board president Vladislav Lučić.

Personal life 
Belić attended the First Belgrade Gymnasium where he graduated on 1958. He earned his bachelor's degree in law from the University of Belgrade in 1962.

References

1940 births
2020 deaths
Basketball players from Belgrade
JA Vichy players
KK Crvena Zvezda executives
KK Crvena zvezda players
Serbian basketball executives and administrators
Serbian expatriate basketball people in France
20th-century Serbian lawyers
Serbian men's basketball players
University of Belgrade Faculty of Law alumni
Yugoslav men's basketball players
21st-century Serbian lawyers
Yugoslav lawyers